The Civil Aviation Authority (CAA) is the statutory corporation which oversees and regulates all aspects of civil aviation in the United Kingdom. Its areas of responsibility include:

 Supervising the issuing of pilots' licences, testing of equipment, calibrating of navaids, and many other inspections (Civil Aviation Flying Unit).
 Managing the regulation of security standards, including vetting of all personnel in the aviation industry (Directorate of Aviation Security).
 Overseeing the national protection scheme for customers abroad in the event of a travel company failure (Air Travel Organisers' Licensing – ATOL).

The CAA is a public corporation of the Department for Transport, liaising with the government via the Standards Group of the Cabinet Office.

Responsibilities
The CAA directly or indirectly regulates all aspects of aviation in the UK. In some aspects of aviation it is the primary regulator.

The UK government requires that the CAA's costs are met entirely from its charges on those whom it regulates. Unlike many other countries, there is no direct government funding of the CAA's work. It is classed as a public corporation, established by statute, in the public sector. The connection it has with the government is via the machinery of government and the Standards Group of the Cabinet Office.

The CAA regulates (approximately):

 Active professional and private pilots (50,000) 
 Licensed aircraft engineers (12,400) 
 Air traffic controllers (2,350) 
 Airlines (206) 
 Licensed aerodromes (241) 
 Organisations involved in the design, production and maintenance of aircraft (950) 
 ATOL holders (2,400) 
 Aircraft registered in the UK (19,000)
 Alternative Dispute Resolution providers

ATOL
The CAA also oversees the Air Travel Organisers' Licensing (ATOL).

By law, every UK travel company which sells air holidays and flights is required to hold an ATOL, which stands for Air Travel Organiser's Licence.

If a travel company with an ATOL ceases trading, the ATOL scheme protects customers who had booked holidays with the firm. It ensures they do not get stranded abroad or lose money.

The scheme is designed to reassure customers that their money is safe, and will provide assistance in the event of a travel company failure.

History
Before 1972, regulation of aviation was the responsibility of the Air Registration Board.

The CAA was established in 1972, under the terms of the Civil Aviation Act 1971, following the recommendations of a government committee chaired by Sir Ronald Edwards. The CAA has been a public corporation of the Department for Transport since then. The Air Registration Board became the Airworthiness Division of the Authority.

The Civil Aviation Act 1982 was an Act of Parliament to address evolving conditions, and currently governs air flight in the UK.

Responsibility for air traffic control in the UK passed to NATS in the run-up to the establishment of its public-private partnership in 2001.

The priorities of the chair, as recorded by letter upon the accession to government of the Cameron–Clegg coalition were, chief amongst others:
 to continue to develop UK State Safety Programme to meet ICAO requirements
 to set a cross-industry agenda in order to address potential safety risks
 to take action to foster a risk-based and proportionate safety management capability
 to work with European and International partners in order to drive global standards in safety improvement

From 1 April 2014, the CAA took over a number of aviation security functions from the Department for Transport. The new Directorate of Aviation Security within the CAA now manages rule-making and compliance to deliver proportionate and focussed regulation for UK aviation to ensure the highest standards of security across the civil aviation sector. Air Safety Support International, a subsidiary of the CAA, is responsible for air safety in the British Overseas Territories. The CAA also manages all national security vetting for the aviation industry.

The United Kingdom was a member of the Joint Aviation Authorities, which became the European Aviation Safety Agency. Following Brexit and a transition period, the United Kingdom left EASA on 31 December 2020. The transport secretary Grant Shapps said "As you would expect from an independent nation, we can't be subject to the rules and laws made by somebody else, so we can't accept rules from the EU commission and we can't accept rulings in terms of court cases from the European court of justice or anybody else, any more than the US would".

Leadership

Chair
Guy Francis Johnson CBE (formerly Secretary of the ARB) succeeded Lord Brabazon as chairman on his retirement. GFJ died in February 1969.
Sir Roy McNulty (−2009) was in post as chair for eight years until his retirement in 2009.

Dame Deirdre Hutton (August 2009 – August 2020) was appointed to chair the CAA in 2009 by Transport Secretary Geoff Hoon. and was still posted in 2017.

Sir Stephen Hillier (August 2020 – ) was approved by Parliament in June 2020 and took the post in August of the same year.

Chief Executive

Andrew Haines was Chief Executive until 2018 when his term of office was allowed to expire normally.

On 30 November 2017, the board appointed Richard Moriarty as Chief Executive. He acceded the job in summer 2018.

Geography

The CAA head office is located in Aviation House on the grounds of Gatwick Airport in Crawley, Sussex. The Authority relocated from its previous London head office in early 2019, moving its head office functions to its existing office at Aviation House, as well as opening a new London branch office at Westferry Circus, Canary Wharf by that July.

GA regulation
General aviation is an official category that covers a wide range of unscheduled air activity such as flying clubs and training establishments. In 2013 the CAA announced a new approach to regulating GA which will be more proportionate. A new dedicated GA unit was established in 2014 www.caa.co.uk/ga

CAA Flying Unit 

The CAA was also responsible for the calibration of navigation and approach aids until the Flight Calibration Services group was privatised and sold to Flight Precision Ltd in 1996.

The history of the Civil Aviation Flying Unit (CAFU) can be traced back to the Air Ministry's Civil Operations Fleet founded in 1944. The CAA and its predecessors have operated 49 aircraft of 13, primarily British, aircraft types including de Havilland Tiger Moths, Avro Ansons, Airspeed Consuls, Percival Princes, de Havilland Doves, Hawker Siddeley HS 748s and Hawker Siddeley HS 125s.

The roles performed by CAFU aircraft included:
 Calibration and testing of radio/radar navigational aids in the UK and overseas
 Flight testing of candidates for the initial issue of commercial pilots' licences, instrument ratings and instructor ratings
 Training and testing of authorised instrument and type-rating examiners
 Carriage of Government Ministers, MEPs and other officials
 Charter flights for Dan-Air Services Ltd
 Radar target flying for the College of Air Traffic Control
 Ordnance Survey photographic flights
 Airport lighting inspections
 Aerodrome categorisation and evaluation flights
 Trials of new equipment and procedures, e.g. Microwave Landing Systems, ground proximity warning systems, Extended Range Twin-engine Operations (ETOPS)
 Refresher flying for Flight Operations Inspectors and other staff
 Educational flights for local schools,

Beyond the privatisation of the calibration service in 1996, the Civil Aviation Authority operated two HS 125-700 aircraft successively up until 2002, providing conversion and continuation flying for professional CAA pilots, conducting radar trials for National Air Traffic Services (NATS) and serving the CAA, NATS and Highlands & Islands Airports Ltd (HIAL) in the communications role.

Previous to the privatisation, Stansted Airport had been the home of Flight Calibration; however, in 1996 the department was moved to Teesside Airport near Darlington (County Durham) with the photographic laboratory services contracted out to a local company, HighLight Photographics.

CAA Signals Training Establishment (STE) – Bletchley Park
In the early 70's CAASTE was based in Block D with further Navigation Aid and Radar classrooms on the northwest corner of the park (now occupied by housing). The STE trained technicians to maintain airport and en-route telecommunications and navigational aids for UK airport and en-route services, including telecommunications, navigational aids and radar.

A two-to-three-year locally domiciled apprenticeship trained technicians who were then posted to airports or en-route centres for on-going employment. STE also provided training facilities for existing technicians to keep up to date with technological developments or to enhance their skills on a broader range of equipments.

Apprentices had exclusive use of the 'AT Club' (Apprentice Technicians Club) and also to the Bletchley Park 'Radio Shack', based in the old DF hut near the entrance to Block D, with a call-sign of 'G4BWD' – 'Golf Four Building Works Department', able to access the 2-metre band, with a Yagi attached to the remnant of the DF antenna on top of the building, and a "long wire" for HF use.

In 1974, STE developed a newer training course, reducing training to a one-to-two-year period for higher-qualified ('A'-level and beyond) entrants, nicknamed 'Super-ATs' or 'Super-Techs'.

CAA College of Telecommunications Engineering (CTE) – Bletchley 
In 1975/1976, the 'Signals Training Establishment' was renamed the 'College of Telecommunications Engineering', with 'Apprentice Technicians' being re-badged as 'Engineer Cadets', no longer passing out as 'Radio Technicians' but as 'Air Traffic Engineers'.

See also

Air Accidents Investigation Branch
Air safety
Civil Aviation Department (Hong Kong)
Military Aviation Authority
Pilot licensing in the United Kingdom
Strasser Scheme

References

External links 
 
 ATOL

Aviation safety in the United Kingdom
Organizations established in 1972
United Kingdom
Aviation organisations based in the United Kingdom
United Kingdom tribunals
Statutory corporations of the United Kingdom government
Department for Transport
Organisations based in West Sussex
1972 establishments in the United Kingdom
Regulators of the United Kingdom
Organisations based in Crawley
Civil aviation in the United Kingdom